Heino von Heimburg (24 October 1889 – October 1945) was a  German U-boat commander in the Kaiserliche Marine during World War I and served also as Vizeadmiral (vice admiral) in the Kriegsmarine during World War II.

World War I

On 16 July, Heimburg sailed for the Dardanelles. This was at a time when the range of submarines was very limited. To reach Bodrum, UB-14 had to be towed a considerable part of the distance by an Austrian destroyer. Even so, her engine broke down off Crete and her compass became defective. Despite these problems, she arrived at Bodrum on 24 July. A maintenance team then had to travel from Constantinople to carry out necessary repairs to both submarines. At the time, this journey was not easy, being made partly by train and partly by camel.

On 12 August, Heimburg sailed from Bodrum for the known steamer route between Alexandria and the Dardanelles. His first sighting was of a fully lit hospital ship seen that evening which was not attacked. On 13 August, he first sighted the liner , in service as a hospital ship. 

He fired one torpedo from under a mile away which hit her stern. Royal Edward sank quickly in position  six miles west of Kandeliusa in the Aegean Sea. The after deck was awash in three minutes, and the ship sank by the stern in six minutes. The death toll included 132 crewmembers and perhaps 1000 soldiers, though figures vary. The survivors were picked up by Soudan, two French destroyers and some trawlers. UB-14 did not harass the rescue effort, but headed back to Bodrum with some technical problems, arriving on the morning of the 15 August.

In August, Heimburg sank the Australian troopship Southland, bound for Gallipoli. Approximately thirty men were killed, while the remaining troops and crew were rescued by nearby ships. A skeleton crew of volunteers managed to keep the ship afloat and beach it in Moudros harbour.

On 4 September, the British submarine  became entangled in enemy torpedo nets off Nagara Point in the Dardanelles. All attempts to free the submarine failed. However, they had caught the attention of Heimburg, currently in harbour with UB-14, which was undergoing repairs at nearby Çanakkale. He visited the spot in a small skiff, from which he lowered a small explosive charge. E7 was forced to the surface. Her crew scuttled her before they were taken as prisoners of war.

On 5 November, Heimburg torpedoed and sank the British submarine . On 11 August, Heino von Heimburg was awarded the Pour le Mérite.

Interwar period
While interviewing German veterans of the U-boats, American journalist Lowell Thomas was introduced to Heimburg by Lothar von Arnauld de la Perière. Heimburg's interview about his wartime service appeared in Thomas' 1928 book Raiders of the Deep.

World War II
At the beginning of World War II, Heimburg was a judge at the Reichskriegsgericht. Until 1943, when he was retired, Heimburg served in Bremen. In 1944 he was selected to sit on the People's court, a Nazi special court. In March 1945 Heimburg was apprehended by the Soviets and died in a POW camp near Stalingrad in 1945.

Awards 
 Iron Cross of 1914, 1st and 2nd class
 Knight's Cross of the Royal House Order of Hohenzollern with Swords
 U-boat War Badge (1918) 
 Pour le Mérite (11 August 1917)
 Knight's Cross Second Class of the House and Merit Order of Peter Frederick Louis with Swords (Oldenburg)
 Friedrich August Cross, 1st class (Oldenburg)
 Knight's Cross of the Order of Leopold (Austria)
 Order of the Iron Crown, 3rd class with War Decoration (Austria)
 Silver Imtiyaz Medal with Sword (Ottoman Empire)
 Gold Liakat Medal with Sword (Ottoman Empire)
 Knight's Cross of the Order of Military Merit with Crown (Bulgaria)

References

Citations

Bibliography

External links 
axishistory.com webpage - Forum about the most decorated soldiers of the Wehrmacht including Heino von Heimburg
raundswarmemorials.org webpage - History of RMS Royal Edward
militaryhistoryonline.com Article mentioning sinking of SS Southland

1889 births
1945 deaths
Military personnel from Hanover
People from the Kingdom of Hanover
U-boat commanders (Imperial German Navy)
Recipients of the Pour le Mérite (military class)
Recipients of the Imtiyaz Medal
Recipients of the Liakat Medal
Knights of the Order of Military Merit (Bulgaria)
Imperial German Navy personnel of World War I
German prisoners of war in World War II held by the Soviet Union
German people who died in Soviet detention
Reichsmarine personnel
Vice admirals of the Kriegsmarine
20th-century German judges